In financial mathematics, a self-financing portfolio is a portfolio having the feature that, if there is no exogenous infusion or withdrawal of money, the purchase of a new asset must be financed by the sale of an old one.

Mathematical definition 
Let  denote the number of shares of stock number 'i' in the portfolio at time , and  the price of stock number 'i' in a frictionless market with trading in continuous time. Let

Then the portfolio  is self-financing if

Discrete time 
Assume we are given a discrete filtered probability space , and let  be the solvency cone (with or without transaction costs) at time t for the market. Then a portfolio  (in physical units, i.e. the number of each stock) is self-financing (with trading on a finite set of times only) if 
 for all  we have that  with the convention that .

If we are only concerned with the set that the portfolio can be at some future time then we can say that .

If there are transaction costs then only discrete trading should be considered, and in continuous time then the above calculations should be taken to the limit such that .

See also
 Replicating portfolio

References

Mathematical finance